Tasya Teles (born February 1, 1985) is a Canadian actress. She is known for her role as Echo in The CW's The 100. Teles has also played Kendra in DirecTV's Rogue, Nat in the Crave series Shoresy, and Daniella in BBC America's Intruders.

Biography 
Teles was born in Toronto, Ontario. Her mother was born in Edmonton, Alberta, while her father is Brazilian from Minas Gerais state. She and her family moved to Vancouver, British Columbia, when she was five years old. Teles studied theatre at Concordia University in Montreal, Quebec.

Career 
Teles played a recurring role on DirecTV's Rogue and was a series regular on The CW's The 100 in the role of Echo. She has appeared on Showcase's Continuum, Lifetime's Witches of East End, USA Network's Rush, BBC America's Intruders and The CW's Supernatural and iZombie. Teles has also been featured in the Lifetime television film Grumpy Cat's Worst Christmas Ever, as well as having had a lead role in the Lifetime movies Damaged and Autumn Dreams. She has worked on several indie features, including starring roles in Leila, Regret, Magdalena, Eat Me and Skin Trade. She also voices Sitara in the video game Watch Dogs 2.

Filmography

Film

Television

Video games

References

External links 
 

1985 births
Living people
Actresses from Toronto
Actresses of Brazilian descent
Canadian film actresses
Canadian people of Brazilian descent
Canadian people of Ukrainian descent
Canadian television actresses
Concordia University alumni
21st-century Canadian actresses